The 1993 AFL Foster's Cup was the Australian Football League pre-season cup competition played in its entirety before the 1993 season began.

Games

1st Round

|- bgcolor="#CCCCFF"
| Home team
| Home team score
| Away team
| Away team score
| Ground
| Crowd
| Date
|- bgcolor="#FFFFFF"
| Richmond
| 22.15 (147)
| Sydney
| 10.7 (67)
| Lavington Oval
| 7,062
| Saturday, 13 February 
|- bgcolor="#FFFFFF"
| Carlton
| 9.18 (72)
| Footscray
| 10.14 (74)
| Waverley Park
| 20,019
| Saturday, 13 February
|- bgcolor="#FFFFFF"
| Fitzroy
| 15.9 (99)
| Geelong
| 13.9 (87)
| Waverley Park
| 6,423
| Sunday, 14 February
|- bgcolor="#FFFFFF"
|  Collingwood
| 8.13 (61)
| Melbourne
| 9.11 (65)
| Princes Park
| 11,665
| Wednesday, 17 February
|- bgcolor="#FFFFFF"
| St Kilda
| 10.11 (71)
| West Coast
| 16.15 (111)
| Subiaco Oval
| -
| Saturday, 20 February 
|- bgcolor="#FFFFFF"
| North Melbourne
| 5.6 (36)
| Adelaide
| 27.21 (183)
| Football Park
| 24,234
| Wednesday, 24 February 
|- bgcolor="#FFFFFF"
| Essendon
| 16.17 (113)
| Brisbane
| 11.10 (76)
| Kardinia Park
| 3,929
| Saturday, 27 February

Quarter-finals

|- bgcolor="#CCCCFF"
| Home team
| Home team score
| Away team
| Away team score
| Ground
| Crowd
| Date
|- bgcolor="#FFFFFF"
| Footscray
| 13.12 (90)
| Fitzroy
| 13.17 (95)
| Kardinia Park
| 4,179
| Sunday, 28 February
|- bgcolor="#FFFFFF"
|  Hawthorn
| 11.7 (73)
| Richmond
| 17.11 (113)
| Waverley Park
| 16,288
| Wednesday, 3 March 
|- bgcolor="#FFFFFF"
| Melbourne
| 5.9 (39)
| West Coast
| 11.9 (75)
| Waverley Park
| 7,276
| Saturday, 6 March
|- bgcolor="#FFFFFF"
| Adelaide
| 13.10 (88)
| Essendon
| 16.11 (107)
| Waverley Park
| 6,867
| Sunday, 7 March

Semi-finals

|- bgcolor="#CCCCFF"
| Home team
| Home team score
| Away team
| Away team score
| Ground
| Crowd
| Date
|- bgcolor="#FFFFFF"
|  Fitzroy
| 14.8 (92)
| Richmond
| 15.8 (98)
| Waverley Park
| 18,683
| Wednesday, 10 March 
|- bgcolor="#FFFFFF"
| West Coast
| 9.7 (61)
| Essendon
| 12.9 (81)
| Waverley Park
| 13,193
| Saturday, 13 March

Final

|- bgcolor="#CCCCFF"
| Home team
| Home team score
| Away team
| Away team score
| Ground
| Crowd
| Date
|- bgcolor="#FFFFFF"
| Richmond
| 11.13 (79)
| Essendon
| 14.18 (102)
| Waverley Park
| 75,533
| Saturday, 20 March

See also

List of Australian Football League night premiers
1993 AFL season

References

Australian Football League pre-season competition
Fosters Cup, 1993